The 2014 Asian Junior Athletics Championships was the 16th edition of the international athletics competition for Asian under-20 athletes, organised by the Asian Athletics Association and the Chinese Taipei Track & Field Association. Events were held at Taipei Municipal Stadium in Taipei, Republic of China from 12–15 June. A total of 44 events were contested, with the events being evenly split between the sexes.

China narrowly beat Japan to extend its long-running undefeated streak at the competition. China had the most gold medals with twelve and also the highest tally with 24. Japan won eleven events and gathered 21 medals. Qatar had the next most gold medals, with six, while the hosts Chinese Taipei had the third highest medal total at 15. Twenty-two of the participating nations reached the medal table; Pakistan and Oman were the only participants not to medal. China had particular success in the jumps, winning all such events on both the men's and women's programmes. Qatar won no women's medals, but its male athletes won at all distances from 400 metres to 5000 metres.

Three championship records were broken at the event. Iran's men's 200 metres winner Mohammadhossein Abareghi set a championship record of 20.63 seconds in the first round of the event. Oanh Nguyen Thi of Vietnam broke the women's 3000 metres steeplechase with 10:27.29 seconds (nearly twenty seconds ahead of the runner-up). All three medallists in the men's 110 metres hurdles were under the previous record mark, but Japan's Taio Kanai was still clear above the field in 13.33 seconds.

Some of the top performing athletes will go on to compete at the 2014 World Junior Championships in Athletics. Ashraf Amgad Elseify added the global title to his Asian men's hammer crown. Men's long jumper Shotaro Shiroyama and women's shot putter Navjeet Kaur Dhillon repeated their bronze medallist placings there. Li Xiaohong, women's triple jump runner-up, also took the bronze in Eugene, Oregon.

After the competition, Shahin Mehrdelan, Iran's original winner in the men's shot put, was disqualified after failing his post-event doping test. Shahin Jafari, another Iranian, was elevated to the gold medal.

Medal summary

Men

 Iran's men's 200 metres winner Mohammadhossein Abareghi set a championship record of 20.63 seconds in the first round of the event, but was a little slower in the final.
 Iran's men's shot-put winner Shahin Mehrdelan got disqualified after failing in doping control test in the championships. Minor medallists Shahin Jafari (Iran) and Shakti Solanki (India) were promoted to the gold and silver medals while fourth placer Artyom Davletov (Uzbekistan) was given the bronze medal.

Women

2014 Medal table

Participation

See also
 List of sporting events in Taiwan

References

Results
16th Asian Junior Athletics Championships Women Results. Taipei2014. Retrieved on 2014-07-13.
 16th Asian Junior Athletics Championships Men Results. Taipei2014. Retrieved on 2014-07-13.
Results by day

External links
Official website
SESSION Official results website
Athletics Asia website

Asian Junior Athletics Championships
Asian Junior Championships
Asian Junior Athletics Championships
Sports competitions in Taipei
Athletics competitions in Taiwan
Junior Athletics Championships
International sports competitions hosted by Taiwan
2014 in youth sport
Asian Junior Athletics Championships